This is a list of Puerto Rican Academy Award winners and nominees. This list details the performances of Puerto Rican filmmakers, actors, actresses and films that have either been nominated for or have won an Academy Award.

Acting categories

Best Actor

Best Supporting Actor

Best Supporting Actress

Writing categories

Best Adapted Screenplay

Best Foreign Language Film

Puerto Rico has submitted films for the Foreign Film category since 1985. However, as of 2007, only one film has been nominated. This happened in 1990 when Lo que le Pasó a Santiago (from Jacobo Morales) was nominated. The film lost to Italy's Cinema Paradiso.

In October 2011, awards coordinator Torene Svitil announced that Puerto Rico will no longer be eligible for submissions in the Foreign Language Film category.

Films that have been submitted for consideration are:

References

See also

Cinema of Puerto Rico
List of Puerto Ricans
History of women in Puerto Rico

Puerto Rican
Academy Award
Academy Award